Vestre Moland is a former municipality in the old Aust-Agder county in Norway.  The administrative centre of the municipality was the village of Møglestu where the Vestre Moland Church is located.  The  municipality existed from 1838 until 1962 when it was merged into the municipality of Lillesand. Today, the area of Vestre Moland covers the northern part of the present-day municipality of Lillesand in Agder county. 

Vestre Moland included the island of Justøy and the area surrounding the ladested of Lillesand.  The lake Østre Grimevann is in the northern part of Vestre Moland and the Blindleia inland waterway is located along the coast of Vestre Moland.

History
The municipality (originally the parish) of Vestre Moland was established on 1 January 1838 (see formannskapsdistrikt law). In 1865, the municipality was divided into the two separate municipalities of Vestre Moland (population: 2,167) in the north and Høvåg (population: 2,069) in the south. During the 1960s, there were many municipal mergers across Norway due to the work of the Schei Committee. On 1 January 1962, Vestre Moland (population: 2,454) was merged with the municipality of Høvåg, the ladested of Lillesand, and the Gitmark farm area in the municipality of Eide to form a new, enlarged Lillesand municipality.

Name
The name comes from Old Norse word  which is derived from the river name , which can be linked with the Old Norse word  which means "brave". The word Vestre means "western" (to distinguish itself from Austre Moland which is located further east in present-day Arendal).

Government
The municipal council  of Vestre Moland was made up of 21 representatives that were elected to four year terms.  The party breakdown of the final municipal council was as follows:

See also
List of former municipalities of Norway

References

Lillesand
Former municipalities of Norway
1838 establishments in Norway
1962 disestablishments in Norway